Stakes Is High is the fourth studio album by American hip hop group De La Soul. It was released on July 2, 1996, through Tommy Boy Records. The album marked a change in the group's sound and direction, as it was their first release not produced in collaboration with Prince Paul. Stakes Is High was mainly produced by the group themselves, with additional tracks provided by Jay Dee, DJ Ogee, Spearhead X and Skeff Anslem. It is considered the group's darkest and most serious album. It received mostly strong reviews but little commercial success.

History
Stakes Is High marked the first time De La Soul did not collaborate with longtime producer Prince Paul on an album, as the group felt that the production he turned in for it didn't match the album's mood.

After the album's release, the group toured extensively and remained rather quiet before returning in 2000 with the first installment of their "Art Official Intelligence" series, Mosaic Thump.

Stakes Is High deals with many topics, including the state of hip-hop, the commercialization of hip-hop culture, and criticism of gangsta rap. Gangsta rapper 2Pac later retaliated on the song "Against All Odds" from his posthumous 1996 album The Don Killuminati: The 7 Day Theory (as well as the unreleased song "Watch Ya Mouth" recorded during the same sessions). Naughty By Nature member Treach also took serious offense at the record, creating a feud that only died down after about a decade and a half after Stakes Is High was released.

Stakes Is High helped introduce rapper Mos Def to a wider audience, on the track "Big Brother Beat". Common also makes an appearance on "The Bizness".

Interludes
Like other De La Soul albums, Stakes Is High has a running theme, which in this case is the group's concern about the state of rap, as well as the state of hip hop culture and how it is regarded in general. The following sound clips are featured:

The introduction track begins with various clips of interviews, the interviewees describing where they were when they first heard the influential rap album Criminal Minded.
At the end of track 9, "Long Island Degrees", a "redneck" explains why he hates rap music ("There's no music in it. It's just niggers talking.")
At the end of track 10, "Betta Listen", there is a clip of Posdnuos and Maseo discussing an error in communication about a club.
At the end of track 15, "Pony Ride"—an excerpt from the documentary Crumb, in which Maxon Crumb discusses his struggle living on the streets, describing his periods of optimism and depression. Of his situation, he remarks, "Stakes is high".
The beginning and end of track 16, "Stakes is High", feature sound clips of people playing dice. A man nearby discusses the O. J. Simpson trials.
The clip at the end of the final track, "Sunshine", closes the album with a young man saying "Yo, when I first heard 3 Feet High and Rising, I was" and then the clip is cut out in similar fashion to "Fight the Power" in Public Enemy's legendary album, Fear of a Black Planet. 3 Feet High and Rising was De La Soul's first release and a very influential album, held in similarly high regard as Criminal Minded, which is discussed at the beginning of the album.

Track listing

Notes
  indicates an additional producer.
 "Baby Baby Baby Baby Ooh Baby" features additional vocals by the Jazzyfatnastees.

Charts

Weekly charts

Year-end charts

References

De La Soul albums
1996 albums
Tommy Boy Records albums
Albums produced by J Dilla